The following NASCAR national series were held in 1957:

1957 NASCAR Grand National Series - The premier racing series in NASCAR. (Currently Cup Series)
 The 1957 Grand National Series was won by Buck Baker, his second in a row.
1957 NASCAR Sportsman Division - The second-tier racing series in NASCAR. (Currently Xfinity Series)
1957 NASCAR Convertible Division - The NASCAR Convertible Division

 
NASCAR seasons